Devon is an unincorporated community in Bourbon County, Kansas, United States.  As of the 2020 census, the population of the community and nearby areas was 71.

History
Devon was originally called Mill Creek, and under the latter name was founded in 1860. The present name is after Devon, in England.

Demographics

For statistical purposes, the United States Census Bureau has defined Devon as a census-designated place (CDP).

Education
The community is served by Fort Scott USD 234 public school district.

References

Further reading

External links
 Bourbon County maps: Current, Historic - KDOT

Unincorporated communities in Bourbon County, Kansas
Unincorporated communities in Kansas